The common coquí or coquí (Eleutherodactylus coqui) is a species of frog endemic to Puerto Rico belonging to the family Eleutherodactylidae. The species is named for the loud call the males make at night. This sound serves two purposes. "CO" serves to repel other males and establish territory while the "KEE" serves to attract females. Since the auditory systems of males and females respond preferentially to different notes of the male call, this is an example of a sex difference in a sensory system. The common coquí is a very important aspect of Puerto Rican culture, and it has become an unofficial territorial symbol of Puerto Rico.

Taxonomy
The common coquí was described as a species new to science by Richard Thomas in 1966. It belongs to the genus Eleutherodactylus which in Greek means free toes. This family is also known as the "robber" or "thief" frogs. This genus contains 185 species, which are found in the Southern United States, Central America, South America, and the Caribbean. It is part of the Order Anura, which includes all frogs and toads. The scientific name of the Common coquí, Eleutherodactylus coqui, was first described by Spanish naturalist José Félix de Arroyo de la Cuesta in 1875 (Arroyo de la Cuesta, 1875). The genus Eleutherodactylus, of which the Common coquí is a member, is the largest genus of frogs in the world, with over 700 known species. The Common coquí is closely related to other members of the Eleutherodactylidae family, including the Eleutherodactylus jasperi and the Eleutherodactylus portoricensis. These species are all native to Puerto Rico and are distinguished from each other by their physical characteristics and vocalizations (Joglar and López, 1997). This taxonomic classification reflects the evolutionary relationships between the Common coquí and other species within the animal kingdom.

Description

Appearance and Lifespan 
Full-grown male coquís measure, from snout to vent, from 30 to 37 mm, with an average of 34 mm, while full-grown females measure from 36 to 52 mm, with an average of 41 mm. The location of the frog also effects the size, for example the higher the elevation, the larger the coquis become. The size differences between sexes are a result of additional energy consumption related to breeding behavior by males.

Coquís are muddy-brown in mottled coloration on the top with rust-tan flanks and a light-gray belly. As tree frogs, Coquís possess sticky pads on the tips of their toes which help them adhere to moistened or slippery surfaces They do not possess webbed feet and are not adapted to swimming.

The known lifespan of the common coquí is up to 6 years in the wild, but the majority of adults do not live past one year.
It is generally thought that the species has a relatively short lifespan, with most individuals living for less than a year. In a study of the population dynamics of the Common coquí, researchers found that the species has a high mortality rate, with only a small proportion of individuals surviving to reach adulthood. This high mortality is likely due to a variety of factors, including predation, disease, and competition for resources. Overall, the Common coquí is thought to have a short lifespan, with most individuals living for less than a year. This is due to a combination of factors that affect the species' survival in its natural environment.

Behavior 
The common coquis are nocturnal and their behavior is influenced by the surrounding environment, specifically the moisture levels. When humidity levels rise at night they emerge and begin climbing to their homes in the canopy. As these humidity levels decrease they move back down to lower levels where the humidity is higher. The younger coqui populations live in the understory on leaves during the drier periods. The leaves are particularly common with this population because they provide protection from invaders. As they grow into adulthood, the coquis journey up to the canopy and begin the process stated above.

A comparative behavioral study between frog species identified possible explanation for jump and hydration level correlations. The paper, "Water loss, cutaneous resistance, and effects of dehydration on locomotion of Eleutherodactylus frogs," examines the effects of water loss and dehydration on two species of neotropical frogs, the common coquí and the cave coquí (Eleutherodactylus cooki). The researchers found that jumping performance declined with an increase in water loss and a longer duration of exposure to dehydrating conditions. The common coquí, which occupies a wider range of habitats, including dry forests, had a slightly higher rate of water loss and lower cutaneous resistance than the cave coquí. However, these differences were not significant enough to explain the different geographic distributions of the two species. The study suggests that behavioral adaptations, rather than physiological differences, may play a role in the common coquí's ability to survive in drier habitats.

Habitat

Native Disruption 
Common coquís are native to the islands of Puerto Rico, Vieques and Culebra, where they are widespread and abundant; the only notable exception occurs in Puerto Rican dry forests, where the species is rarer. The common coquí is the most abundant frog in Puerto Rico, with densities estimated at 20,000 individuals/ha. Densities fluctuate depending on the season and habitat. Generally, densities are higher during the latter half of the wet season and decrease during the dry season. The species is considered a habitat generalist, occurring in a wide range of habitats, including mesic broadleaf forests, mountains, and urban areas, found in bromeliads, tree holes, and under trunks, rocks or trash. Since the species does not require bodies of water to reproduce, they can be found on most altitudes, provided sufficient moisture is available. Adults generally tend to be found at higher altitudes than juveniles.

The common coquís are often found in cohabitation with humans. Because of their unrestricted habitat use, E. coquí can commonly be found in homes and parks. E. coquí are found in natural habitats including the human mountain forest at elevations less than 1,200 meters and in the dry forest. They are found specifically within the under story of forests at all elevations up to the canopy.

Distribution as an Invasive Species 
The species has been introduced to Colombia, Hawaii in the United States, and the Virgin Islands. It has become a densely populated invasive species in the Hawaiian Islands, where it was accidentally introduced in the late 1980s, most likely as a stowaway on potted plants, and quickly established itself on all four major islands. It is now considered a pest species by the State of Hawaii, and is on a list of 100 of the world's worst invasive alien species. As an invasive species, it can reach up to 91,000 individuals/ha, almost 5 times its maximum density in its native Puerto Rico. Higher densities in its invaded range are likely bolstered by a release from native predators, lack of interspecific competitors, and abundant food availability. They were previously introduced in the Dominican Republic and to Louisiana and Florida, but these populations have now been eradicated.

Common coquís in areas where their density exceeds 51,000/ha could consume over 300,000 invertebrates per night. Because of their large populations, Hawaii worries about both economic and ecological impacts. The common coquí currently costs this state nearly 3 million dollars a year. Its spread has been commonly through the nursery trade, and as a result many people are reluctant to buy plants from nurseries that might be infected. Those began to perform quarantines and de-infestations in order to improve their prospects. Coquis also affect real estate values  in residential neighborhoods, as many refrain from buying houses where their sleep would be disturbed by the up to 73 dB call of the common coquí.

Invasive Management Strategies 
Invasive management practices against the Common coquí frog aim to control and reduce the population of this species in areas where it has been introduced, such as Hawaii. Preventative measures include banning the intentional transport of frogs, as well as the implementation of hot-water shower treatments on ornamental plants to kill coquí eggs, subadults, and adults. This can reduce the potential spread of the species through the trade of plants.
Physical control methods, such as hand-capture, can be effective for small populations of Common coquí frogs. Chemical control methods, such as the use of caffeine and water solutions, are also being tested for their efficacy in controlling the species on a larger scale. Citric acid has also been suggested as a potential control method, although its efficacy has not been demonstrated. Overall, a variety of management practices are being explored and implemented in order to control and reduce the population of Common coquí frogs in invaded areas.

Diet
The common coquí is a generalist nocturnal predator, which can consume, as a population, 114,000 invertebrates each night per hectare. Diets vary depending on age and size, but are primarily composed of arthropods. Juveniles consume smaller prey, such as ants, while adults consume more varied diets that include spiders, moths, crickets, snails, and small frogs. The frogs are opportunistic sit-and-wait predators, and will forage on any abundant prey items. Males will occasionally consume eggs from their own clutch, likely to provide supplemental nourishment while guarding their nests.

Calling males eat less prey than quiet males, which consume most of their food by midnight, while calling males had eaten only 18% of their food by the same hour.

Reproduction
Common coquís reproduce over the entire year, but breeding activity peaks around the wet season. Females usually lay between 16 and 40 eggs, four to six times each year, at about eight-week intervals. Eggs are guarded from predators—other common coquís and Subulina snails—by the males. The gestation period of coquís is from 17 to 26 days. The maturation period, the time from egg to reproductive coquí, is around eight months.

Unlike most frogs, which lay their eggs in water, coquís lay their eggs on palm tree leaves or other terrestrial plants. Abandoned bird nests are also used as nests by E. coqui. The bananaquit, Puerto Rican bullfinch and Puerto Rican tody share nests with the coquí. This method of reproduction allows the coquí to live in forests, mountains and other habitats without direct dependency on water. Since eggs are laid on land, coquís bypass the tadpole stage, proceeding to develop limbs within their eggs, rather than going through a metamorphosis as a larva in water. Thus, a fully independent froglet emerges from the egg, with a small tail that is lost shortly after. This stage of direct development has allowed the coqui to become a successful terrestrial colonizer in tropical areas. Eggs hatch within eight weeks and reach reproductive maturity within one year. The common coqui releases their young from the egg using an egg tooth that the genus Eleutherodactylus forms. Both males and females fight off intruders from their nests by jumping, chasing and sometimes biting. The males are the primary caretakers of the eggs. They offer protection and moist environments through skin contact. They will leave during very dry periods in order to collect more moisture for their offspring.

Males begin their mating calls by perching above ground level.

The coqui's call (or canto in Spanish) is used both as a way of attracting a mate and to establish a territorial boundary. A coqui may enter another's territory and challenge the incumbent by starting his call, at which point they may engage in a sort of singing duel (which can last for several minutes). The first to falter in keeping up with the cadence is considered the loser and leaves the area without resorting to physical violence. This behavior is consistent across different species (which have distinctive calls), so it is possible to hear a duel where one coqui sings "COQUI" and another "COQUIRIQUI".

See also

Fauna of Puerto Rico
List of amphibians and reptiles of Puerto Rico
List of endemic fauna of Puerto Rico
Puerto Rican spindalis
Flor de maga

References

Bibliography

Further reading

External links

 Hawaiian Ecosystems at Risk project (HEAR): Eleutherodactylus coqui
 Control of Coqui Frog in Hawaii
 Children Story About Coqui; El Coqui De Madagascar

Amphibians described in 1966
Eleutherodactylus
Coqui, Common
Coqui, Common